Bora Bora is a 1968 Italian sexploitation film, directed and written by Ugo Liberatore starring Haydée Politoff, Corrado Pani, Doris Kunstmann, and Rosine Copie.

Plot
An estranged married couple, who reconcile their differences in the sensual surroundings of the Tahitian island.

Production
Bora Bora was picked up for American distribution by American International Pictures, who removed some scenes (cutting down the running length from 97 to 90 minutes) and replaced the original music of Italian composer Piero Piccioni with a new score by exotica legend Les Baxter, the regular composer of choice for the studio.

Cast
 Haydée Politoff as Marita Ferrio
 Corrado Pani as Roberto Ferrio
 Ivan Scratuglia as Man in the Ferry
 Doris Kunstmann as Susanne
 Rosine Copie as Tehina
 Antoine Coco Puputauki as Mani

External links

References

1968 films
Italian sexploitation films
1960s Italian-language films
Films shot in Bora Bora
1960s Italian films